Serbin is an unincorporated community in southwestern Lee County, Texas, United States. The community's name was changed to Serbin, meaning "Sorbian land" in the Sorbian language, prior to 1860. The West Slavic Sorbs are distinct from the South Slavic Serbs, although the names of the two Slavic ethnic groups probably have a common origin.

The largest single migration of Sorbian immigrants to the United States settled in Texas, using Serbin as the "mother colony". On September 20, 1854, about 550 Sorbian Lutherans from congregations in Lusatia, Prussia, and Saxony left for Texas under the leadership and pastoral care of John Kilian. Upon arriving in Texas, the people of present-day Serbin became the earliest members of the Lutheran Church–Missouri Synod in Texas. St. Paul Lutheran Church, built in 1871, is a typical example of Wendish architecture and is still in full use; the pulpit is located in the front balcony of the church, as seen in the photos of the interior.

The Texas Wendish Heritage Museum is housed in Serbin on the St. Paul church grounds. Occupying three independent buildings including a former St. Paul parochial school building, the museum also has two outdoor exhibits of an intact log cabin and part of a dogtrot house.

Eventually, the Sorbian language in Serbin was replaced by German and English. Kilian even had the tombstone for his wife Maria carved in German in 1881, not Sorbian; the same was done for his stone in 1884.

Neither of the two Sorbian languages is still fluently or regularly spoken in Serbin. According to the 2000 U.S. census, only 37 people in the 78942 ZIP Code area (which also includes Giddings and other nearby towns) spoke a Slavic language other than Polish or Russian at home.

References

Further reading

External links
Serbin, Texas from TexasEscapes.com
 
  
St. Paul Lutheran Church, Serbin, TX
Texas Wendish Heritage Society
Worldwide Wendish Connection

Unincorporated communities in Lee County, Texas
Unincorporated communities in Texas
Sorbian-American culture in Texas